is a former Japanese football player.

Club statistics

References

External links

Tokyo Verdy

1986 births
Living people
Waseda University alumni
Association football people from Kanagawa Prefecture
Japanese footballers
J1 League players
J2 League players
Tokyo Verdy players
Association football defenders